Ziyad Al-Mutairi (born April 30, 1992) is a Saudi football player who played as a midfielder in the Pro League for Al-Faisaly.

References

1992 births
Living people
Saudi Arabian footballers
Al-Fayha FC players
Al-Faisaly FC players
Al-Hazem F.C. players
Al-Kawkab FC players
Place of birth missing (living people)
Saudi First Division League players
Saudi Professional League players
Association football wingers